Dundalk entered the 1994–95 season coming off a poor 1993–94, in which a general decline on and off the pitch reached a nadir – when they had missed out on the "Top Six" round-robin format that decided the title. They had also gone out early in both the FAI Cup and the League of Ireland Cup. Manager Dermot Keely was entering his first full season in charge, having replaced Turlough O'Connor early the previous season. It was Dundalk's 69th consecutive season in the top tier of Irish football.

Season summary
In pre-season, veteran Gino Lawless was awarded a testimonial, and Manchester United were the visitors. In front of a packed Oriel Park, Dundalk took a 2–0 lead, and Eddie van Boxtel saved an Eric Cantona penalty, before United ran out 4–2 winners. Manager Dermot Keely, a Jim McLaughlin protege who had won the Double in 1978–79 as a player at Oriel, had to rebuild the squad due to its age profile, despite a worsening financial position. Early in the new season, however, the financial issues came to a head, and a number of local businessmen formed a new Interim Company to take the club over, saving it from bankruptcy. 

Dundalk had started the season poorly, but a steady improvement in results saw them climb the league table. They reached finals in both the League Cup, (losing 2–1 on aggregate), and the Leinster Senior Cup (losing 2–1), and in the FAI Cup they were defeated in the quarter-final. With seven games to go in the League as many as eight clubs were in contention, but Dundalk were the most consistent, and Keely steered his team to a ninth league title on a final day of drama. They defeated Galway United at home, then, with players and supporters waiting on the pitch to hear the results of Shelbourne's and Derry City's matches, news filtered through that both had failed to win, confirming Dundalk as Champions - their third title in eight seasons. The trophy presented was that won in 1991, as the new trophy lay unopened in Athlone, where Derry City had been favourites to win out on the day. Notably, despite winning the title, nobody at Dundalk won a monthly or end of season award.

First-Team Squad (1994–95)
Sources:

Competitions

League Cup
Source:
Group

Quarter-final

Semi-final

Final

Cork City won 2–1 on aggregate

Leinster Senior Cup
Source:
First Round

Quarter-final

Semi-final

Final

FAI Cup
Source:
First Round

Second Round

Quarter-final

Premier Division
Source:

League table

References
Bibliography

Citations

Dundalk F.C. seasons
Dundalk